Eva Lemezova is a Czechoslovakian Paralympic alpine skier. She competed in the 1976 and 1980 Winter Paralympics. She won four medals, three gold, and one silver.

Career 
At the  1976 Paralympic Winter Games in Örnsköldsvik, she won three gold medals: in slalom III (time 2: 03.74), giant slalom III (time 2: 25.49), and in super combined III, ahead of West German athlete, Traudl Weber. 

At the 1980 Winter Paralympics in Geilo, she finished second in the 3A slalom, with a time of 1:39.93, behind the American Cindy Castellano in 1: 25.84. She was fourth in the giant slalom, with a time of 3:07.95  (behind Cindy Castellano in 2: 39.58, Kathy Poohachof in 2: 42.58 and Franciane Fischer with 2: 52.27).

References 

Living people
Czechoslovak female alpine skiers
Paralympic gold medalists for Czechoslovakia
Paralympic silver medalists for Czechoslovakia
Alpine skiers at the 1976 Winter Paralympics
Alpine skiers at the 1980 Winter Paralympics
Medalists at the 1976 Winter Paralympics
Medalists at the 1980 Winter Paralympics
Paralympic alpine skiers of Czechoslovakia
Year of birth missing (living people)